The Poem of the Man-God (Italian title: Il Poema dell'Uomo-Dio) is a multi-volume work of about five thousand pages on the life of Jesus Christ written by Maria Valtorta. The current editions of the Work bear the title The Gospel as Revealed to Me.

The Work was first published in Italian in 1956 and has since been translated into 10 languages and is available worldwide. It is based on the over 15,000 handwritten pages produced by Maria Valtorta between 1943 and 1947. During these years she reported visions of Jesus and Mary personal conversations with and dictations from Jesus. Her notebooks (published separately) include close to 700 detailed episodes in the life of Jesus, as an extension of the gospels.

Valtorta's handwritten episodes were typed into separate pages by her priest and reassembled in chronological order. The first copy of the Work was presented to Pope Pius XII, and the three Servite priests who attended the 1948 papal audience stated that he gave his verbal approval to "publish this work as is; he who reads will understand." However, the Holy Office forbade publication in 1960 and placed the Work on the Index of Forbidden Books. In 1962, the Work was subsequently removed from the Index and the prohibition lifted.

In 1992, at the request of the Congregation for the Doctrine of the Faith, Cardinal Dionigi Tettamanzi asked the publisher to ensure that "in any future reprint of the volumes, each should, right from its first page, clearly state that the 'visions' and 'dictations' referred to in it cannot be held to be of supernatural origin but must be considered simply as literary forms used by the author to narrate in her own way the life of Jesus". The publisher maintained that this was an implicit declaration that the Work was free of doctrinal or moral error.

Writing
Maria Valtorta was bedridden in Viareggio, Italy, for most of her life due to complications from being struck in the back at random while walking on a street. Valtorta was a member of the Third Order Servites of Mary, affiliated to the order to which her spiritual director, Fr. Romuald Migliorini OSM belonged.

On the morning of Good Friday 1943 she reported having a vision in which Jesus appeared and spoke to her. While Valtorta did not begin writing The Poem of the Man-God until 1944, pre-Poem writings included various topics such as Mariology, Darwinism, and suffering. She reported having many more visions and conversations with Jesus and the Virgin Mary and said that Jesus had asked her to record her visions in writing. She continued to write her visions in her notebooks until 1947.

The Poem of the Man-God is not a sequential transcription of Valtorta's notebooks, because her reported visions (which were dated in her notebooks) were not in the same order as the flow of time in the narrative she wrote. For instance, she reported having a vision of The Last Supper on March 9, 1945, while another on the Beatitudes during the Sermon on the Mount was written more than two months later on May 24, 1945. The book as transcribed by her priest however, follows the life of Jesus in chronological form, with footnotes referring to the dates on which she wrote each episode.

Narrative style
Valtorta frequently described a scene, giving details of the background, trees, mountains and weather conditions on the day in first century Judea that she claims an event took place. For instance, her prelude to the Sermon on the Mount written on May 22, 1945, depicts the road on which Jesus is walking, states that it was a clear day on which Mount Hermon could be seen by Jesus but Lake Merom could not be seen. In some episodes she writes about the colors of the clothing she believed had been worn by Jesus or the Apostles.

Valtorta's accounts include detailed conversations. In the Sermon on the Mount episode written on May 22, 1945, Jesus is met on the road by Saint Philip the Apostle and they converse. The scene then describes how the other Apostles come down the mountain to greet Jesus and how the Sermon on the Mount begins. While the Gospel of Matthew refers to the Beatitudes in a few paragraphs (Matthew 5:3-12), the text for the single Beatitude "poor in the spirit" spoken by Jesus in her vision is one and a half pages long in Valtorta's account. The full text of the Sermon on the Mount that she wrote in her notebook and attributed to Jesus takes three episodes from May 24 to 27, 1945, and is over 30 pages long. The fact that her text of the Beatitudes still has the same eight- or nine-fold structure as the Beatitudes in the Gospel, but is far more detailed, is characteristic of her writings and her imagination.

Her visions describe parables, miracles and episodes in the life of Jesus not present in any of the synoptic Gospels. On February 16, 1944, she wrote her account of the Trial of Jesus by Caiphas. In the synoptic Gospels, Luke places the trial after daybreak, while Matthew and Mark refer to it as taking place at night. Valtorta's version has two trials, one at night and the other after daybreak. The second trial is prompted by Gamaliel's insistence that the time and place of the night trial is against Jewish judicial procedures, and his demand for a new trial after daybreak. Another example is the episode she wrote on February 28, 1946. It reports that in preparation for his Passion, Jesus visited the town of Kerioth to say farewell and performed a miracle, curing a woman described as "Anne of Kerioth" on her deathbed. In this episode, Jesus instructs Anne to forever tend to and comfort Mary of Simon – who Valtorta stated was the mother of Judas Iscariot and who would be heartbroken upon the betrayal by her son and the deaths of Jesus and Judas in the near future.

Astronomical analysis

The narrative of The Poem of the Man-God includes a number of observations of the positions of the heavenly bodies. For instance, in episode written on December 11, 1945, Valtorta wrote of a night Jesus spent at Gadara: "the sky is glistening with countless stars... with its springtime constellations and the magnificent stars of Orion: of Rigil and Betelgeuse, of Aldebaran, of Perseus, Andromeda and Cassiopeia and the Pleiades united like sisters. And Sapphirine Venus covered with diamonds, and Mars of pale ruby and the topaz of Jupiter..."

In 1994 the Christian fundamentalist Lonnie VanZandt analyzed these events to estimate a date for the event described. Using a computer simulation, VanZandt noted that the only possibilities for the observation Valtorta described during the month of March would be AD31 and AD33, and after considering other elements in the narrative concluded that March AD33 was the only possibility. According to VanZandt the estimation of the joint observability of these three stars and the position of the moon during that time would have been almost impossible without a computer system.

Publication 
Maria Valtorta was at first reluctant to have her notebooks published but, on the advice of her priest, in 1947 she agreed to their publication. The handwritten pages were typed and bound by Father Romuald Migliorini OSM and fellow Servite Father Corrado Berti OSM. Shortly after April 1947, Father Berti presented the first copy of the Work to Pope Pius XII, who on February 26, 1948, received Fathers Migliorini and Berti, along with their prior, Father Andrea Checchin, in special audience as reported on the next day's L'Osservatore Romano, the Vatican newspaper.

At the meeting, Pius XII told the three priests; "Publish this work as it is. There is no need to give an opinion about its origin, whether it be extraordinary or not. Who reads it, will understand. One hears of many visions and revelations. I will not say they are all authentic; but there are some of which it could be said that they are." Note, in his December 8, 1978 account of the events concerning Maria Valtorta's writings, Fr. Berti summarized the Pope's words as "Publish this work as it is."

A year later, in 1949, confident of papal approval, Fr. Berti presented the Work for publication to the Vatican Printing Office. However, two commissioners of the Holy Office, Msgr. Giovanni Pepe and Father Berruti, O.P., condemned the "Poem," ordering Berti to hand over every copy and sign an agreement not to publish it. Fr. Berti returned the manuscripts to Valtorta and handed over only his typed versions. In 1950, Maria Valtorta signed a contract with the publisher Michele Pisani, who between 1956 and 1959 printed the Work in four volumes, the first of which was titled The Poem of Jesus and the others The Poem of the Man-God.

According to Bishop Roman Danylak, Valtorta's publisher and editor, Emilio Pisani, together with Father Berti, "found a system for resuming the publication of the Work with such criteria as would not exclude the respect due toward the authority of the Church." After the first volumes of the 10-volume 2nd Edition had already been published, now under Valtorta's name and with Fr. Berti's theological annotations, he was summoned to the Holy Office in December, 1961, where he was able, in an atmosphere of serene dialogue, to relate the previous words and approbation of Pius XII of 1948, and to exhibit the favorable certifications of other authorities. Among these were three consultants to the Holy Office itself: Father (later Cardinal) Augustine Bea, S.J., Pius XII's confessor and Rector of the Pontifical Biblical Institute; Msgr. Alfonsus Carinci, Secretary of the Sacred Congregation of Rites; and Fr. Gabriele Roschini, O.S.M., theologian and Mariologist, whose certifications favorably impressed Cardinal Pizzardo, then Secretary of the Holy Office.

Father Berti returned four more times to the Holy Office in January of 1962, to work with its Vice-Commissioner, Father Giraudo, O.P. Fr. Berti finally obtained a sentence which effectively repealed the 1959 censure on the Index. Father Giraudo stated: "We have no objection to your publishing this 2nd Edition," concluding with: "We will see how the Work [the Poem] is welcomed."

Bishop Danylak states that the publishers of the first edition received the "Official Imprimatur" of the Supreme Authority of the Church, and thus felt authorized to bring out the first Italian edition in four volumes from 1956-1959. However, this was done as an anonymous work at Valtorta's request, and without the theological annotations of later editions to clarify ambiguous passages. It was for these reasons that in 1959, the Holy Office, apparently ignorant of the Official Imprimatur granted earlier by Pius XII, thus invalidly placed the Poem on the former Index of Forbidden Books. This was in effect to overturn the hierarchical structure of the Church, while at the same time violating Canon Law which outlaws any such reversal of a decision of the Supreme Head of the Church by a subsidiary Vatican Congregation, or even by appeal to an Ecumenical Council.

Bishop Danylak later says that Cardinal Edouard Gagnon, writing on October 31, 1987, to the Maria Valtorta Research Center, spoke of "the kind of official Imprimatur granted before witnesses by the Holy Father in 1948", while writer David Michael Lindsey reports Cardinal Gagnon as saying: "This judgment by the Holy Father in 1948 was an official Imprimatur of the type given before witnesses."

On the Index of Prohibited Books 

By a decree of January 5, 1960, the Holy Office condemned the published Work and included it in the Index Librorum Prohibitorum. The decree was published also on L'Osservatore Romano of January 6, 1960, accompanied by a front-page, unsigned article under the heading "A Badly Fictionalized Life of Jesus". The Work was allegedly placed on the Index because of its claim to supernatural guidance. However, it was later discovered that it was placed on the Index because it was published as an anonymous work at Valtorta's request, and without the theological annotations of later editions to clarify ambiguous passages.

The Vatican newspaper republished the content of the decree on December 1, 1961, together with an explanatory note, as mentioned by Cardinal Joseph Ratzinger, Prefect of the Congregation for the Doctrine of the Faith, in his letter 144/58 of January 31, 1985, in which he entrusted to Cardinal Giuseppe Siri, Archbishop of Genoa, the decision whether to inform a priest of his archdiocese that the Valtorta work had indeed been placed on the Index, which keeps its moral force, and that "a decision against distributing and recommending a work, which has not been condemned lightly, may be reversed, but only after profound changes that neutralize the harm which such a publication could bring forth among the ordinary faithful".

In 1992 Cardinal Dionigi Tettamanzi, President of the Italian Episcopal Conference, directed the publisher of the Work to state clearly at the beginning of each volume that the "visions" and "revelations" referred to in it "cannot be held to be of supernatural origin but must be considered simply as literary forms used by the author to narrate in her own way the life of Jesus". His directive, communicated by letter 324/92 of January 6, 1992, was made at the request of the Congregation for the Doctrine of the Faith. His letter also recalled the notes about the matter that appeared on L'Osservatore Romano of January 6, 1960, and June 15, 1966.

In 1993 Cardinal Ratzinger wrote to Bishop Raymond James Boland of Birmingham, Alabama, that his Congregation had made that request to the Italian Bishops Conference to ask the publisher to have a disclaimer printed in the volumes that "clearly indicated from the very first page that the 'visions' and 'dictations' referred to in it are simply the literary forms used by the author to narrate in her own way the life of Jesus. They cannot be considered supernatural in origin."

Support
A strong connection between the Medjugorje apparitions and the writings of Maria Valtorta have been documented. The visionaries Marija Pavlovic and Vicka Ivankovic have stated that Maria Valtorta's records of her conversations with Jesus are truthful. According to a statement Ivankovic made on January 27, 1988, in 1981 the Virgin Mary told her at Medjugorje: "If a person wants to know Jesus he should read Maria Valtorta. That book is the truth".

Archbishop George Hamilton Pearce SM wrote: "I find it tremendously inspiring. It is impossible for me to imagine that anyone could read this tremendous work with an open mind and not be convinced that its author can be no one but the Holy Spirit of God."

Saint Padre Pio, when asked about Maria Valtorta’s ‘The Poem of the Man-God’, said: “I don’t advise you to read it – I order you to”. Padre Pio was an ardent supporter of Maria Valtorta’s writings and continued to advocate that others experience the writings for themselves.

Saint Mother Teresa traveled lightly, but she always traveled with three books: the Bible, her breviary and a volume of ‘The Poem of the Man-God’. Her chaplain of some years twice asked Mother Teresa about the Maria Valtorta book. Both times she simply replied: “Read it”.

Pope Pius XII commented in 1947: “Publish it just as it is. There is no need to give an opinion as to whether it is of supernatural origin. Those who read it will understand. One hears of many visions and revelations. I will not say they are all authentic; but there are some of which it could be said that they are.”

Some notable personages who have approved, endorsed, or praised the Poem of the Man-God include:

 Pope Pius XII
 4 Cardinals
 14 Archbishops
 10 Bishops
 24 extremely learned clerics or  Doctors of Theology/Divinity/Canon Law
 7 members or consultants of the Holy Office/Congregation for the Causes of Saints
 7 Saints/Blesseds/Venerables/Servants of God
 31 Doctors and University Professors

Criticism

Fr. Philip Pavich OFM, an American Croatian Franciscan priest stationed in Medjugorje, sent a circular letter to the Medjugorje fans, questioning the purported visions of Maria Valtorta and the subsequent book.

According to Father Mitch Pacwa SJ, "the long speeches of Jesus and Mary starkly contrast with the evangelists, who portray Jesus as humble, reserved; His discourses are lean, incisive." In addition, Pacwa writes that the poem has "many historical, geographical and other blunders. For instance, Jesus uses screwdrivers (Vol. 1, pp. 195, 223), centuries before screws existed." The full text cited from the Work is as follows: 

“He is by Himself. He works diligently, but peacefully. No abrupt or impatient movement. He is precise and constant in His work. Nothing annoys Him: neither a knot in the wood which will not be planed, nor a screwdriver (I think it is a screwdriver) which falls twice from the bench, nor the smoke floating in the room which must irritate His eyes.”

A thorough scholarly analysis and refutation of the top anti-Valtorta articles is provided with full references.

References

Sources
 Freze, Michael, Voices, Visions, and Apparitions,  OSV Press, Sep 1993, p. 251 
 Rookey O.S.M., Peter M., Shepherd of Souls: The Virtuous Life of Saint Anthony Pucci, Oxford University Press, Jun 2003   
 Lindsey, David Michael, The Woman and the Dragon: The Apparitions of Mary, Pelican, Jan 31, 2001, pp. 324-326  
 Two Friends of Medjugorje, Words From Heaven: Messages of Our Lady from Medjugorje, Saint James Publishing, 1990, p. 145  
 Maunder, Chris, Our Lady of the Nations: Apparitions of Mary in 20th-Century Catholic Europe, Oxford University Press, 2016

Bibliography
 Maria Valtorta, The Poem of the Man-God .
 Maria Valtorta, The Book of Azariah  .

External links
 Official Website
 A Brief History of Events
 Queen of Peace Newsletter, Vol. 1, No. 2, 1988
 Mysterious Claim: Did the Virgin Mary Encourage the Faithful to Read The Poem of the Man-God in Order to Know Jesus?
 Astronomical Dating of The Poem of the Man-God
 Maria Valtorta, Her Life and Work
 Maria Valtorta Documents - L'Osservatore Romano, Imprimaturs, Letter of Pope Paul VI, and Condemnation
  Fr. Mitch Pacwa, S.J., "Is The Poem of the Man-God Simply a Bad Novel?"
 The Church and Maria Valtorta's The Poem of the Man-God
 List of Valtorta Approvals by Bishops, Doctors of Theology/Canon Law
 An Analysis and Refutation of All the Top Anti-Valtorta Articles

Visions of Jesus and Mary
1956 non-fiction books
Books about Jesus
Channelled texts
Controversies in Christian literature